Holy Cross Monastery and Church is a registered historic building complex in Cincinnati, Ohio, listed in the National Register on September 13, 1978.

Founding

Between 1873 and 1977, the Holy Cross Monastery was a Roman Catholic monastery atop Mt. Adams in Cincinnati,  which served a parish of the same name. It was founded by the Passionists, who were first brought to Mt. Adams in 1871 by John Baptist Purcell, the Archbishop of Cincinnati, to run Immaculata Church, founded in 1860.

The first Passionist pastor of Immaculata Parish, Guido Matassi, C.P., immediately saw that the rectory of the parish would be inadequate to their needs as a semi-monastic community. By chance, the building which used to house the Mitchel Observatory (later the Cincinnati Observatory), located only two blocks away from Immaculata Church, was being abandoned due to the effects of industrial pollution.

The terms of the will of the donor of the property which had housed the observatory, however, required the return of the property to his heirs. When Matassi approached them about purchasing the property, they demanded a price which he would not pay. With the encouragement and support of Sarah Peter, daughter of an early Governor of Ohio  and a noted convert to Catholicism, the city stepped in and purchased the property from the heir. The following year Matassi signed a 99-year lease with the City of Cincinnati for a building and a property atop Mt. Adams. The Passionists remodeled the structure and added a third floor.

The Church and Monastery of the Holy Cross

The first Church of the Holy Cross, made out of wood, was finished in 1873, standing next to the monastery, but in 1895 it was replaced by a large, permanent structure. It served mostly Irish immigrants.

In 1899 the monastery was condemned as unsafe, and a new edifice was built in the same location. It was dedicated on June 9, 1901.

Decline of the monastic community

In the late 1960s and early 1970s, thousands of Roman Catholic priests across the United States left the priesthood and religious life. By the mid-1970s, several members of the Passionist community were trying to decide if they wanted to continue as priests or leave the priesthood or religious life altogether. No new candidates were joining the congregation. The regional Passionist superiors made the decision to close it in 1977 and the building sold two years later.

Holy Cross Parish was merged with Immaculata Parish, also located atop Mt. Adams. The combined parish has since been known as Holy Cross-Immaculata.

Notes

External links
Stories of the Mt. Adams Passionists

Passionist Order
National Register of Historic Places in Cincinnati
Italian Renaissance Revival architecture in the United States
Italianate architecture in Ohio
19th-century Christian monasteries
Roman Catholic monasteries in the United States
1873 establishments in Ohio
1977 disestablishments in Ohio
Religious organizations disestablished in 1977
Mount Adams, Cincinnati
Cincinnati Local Historic Landmarks
19th-century Roman Catholic church buildings in the United States
Italianate church buildings in the United States